The 2001 Florida Gators football team represented the University of Florida in the sport of American football during the 2001 college football season.  The Gators competed in Division I-A of the National Collegiate Athletic Association (NCAA) and the Eastern Division of the Southeastern Conference (SEC), playing their home games at Ben Hill Griffin Stadium on the university's Gainesville, Florida campus.

They were coached by Steve Spurrier, who posted an overall win–loss record of 10–2 (.833) for his twelfth and final season before departing to the National Football League (NFL). Spurrier led the Gators to a 56–23 Orange Bowl victory over the Maryland Terrapins in his final game.
 
Sophomore quarterback Rex Grossman threw for over 4,000 yards and was Heisman Trophy runner-up. Grossman, wide receiver Jabar Gaffney and defensive end Alex Brown were consensus All-Americans. Brown's 33 sacks is still a school record for a career.

Before the season
The Gators were ranked preseason No. 1.

Schedule

Sources: 2012 Florida Football Media Guide, and GatorZone.com.

September 11 impact
The annual rivalry game with Tennessee scheduled for September 15, was rescheduled to the final week of the regular season as a result of the tragic events of September 11, 2001.

Season summary

Marshall

The season opened at night in the Swamp on September 1 with a 49–14 triumph over quarterback Byron Leftwich and the Marshall Thundering Herd.

Rex Grossman had a career-high in passing yards by halftime, including a 64-yard touchdown reception by Taylor Jacobs.

The defense also played well as Alex Brown and linebacker Andra Davis had two sacks each.

Louisiana–Monroe

In the second week of play, the Gators overwhelmed the Louisiana–Monroe Warhawks 55–6. Grossman passed for 331 yards and three touchdowns, including two thrown to Jabar Gaffney.

Grossman fumbled the game's first exchange from center, and Louisiana-Monroe capitalized on the opportunity when it scored the game's first touchdown. "It was just an awkward start." said Grossman.

As usual, the Gators and Tennessee Volunteers were slated to meet on the 3rd Saturday of September.  However, the SEC canceled all games on the weekend following the September 11 attacks, and all contests were rescheduled for December 1, 2001, requiring the SEC Championship Game to be pushed back a week as well.

Kentucky

Florida traveled to Lexington and beat the Kentucky Wildcats 44–10.  Grossman passed for 302 yards and four touchdowns.

The Gators struggled early and led just 16–3 at the half, but eventually thrashed the Wildcats with four touchdowns in the second half.

After Kentucky made a touchdown, Earnest Graham sprung lose for a 50-yard touchdown run in the third period to go up 30–10.

Mississippi State

The following week, Florida avenged last year's loss to the 21st-ranked  Mississippi State Bulldogs by shutting them out 52–0. Grossman had 317 yards passing in just the first half. The Gators had 640 yards of total offense on the day, the most in school history for an SEC game.

Grossman passed for 393 yards and five touchdowns in total, becoming the first Florida quarterback to throw for 300 yards in four straight games.

Andra Davis, who missed last year's game, excelled on the defensive side of the ball from his linebacker position with eight tackles and a fumble recovery.

LSU

In Baton Rouge, the Gators defeated the eighteenth-ranked LSU Tigers 44–15. Grossman threw for 319 yards and four touchdowns in just the first half, and by game's end had a school-record 464 yards.

Florida finished with 632 yards of total offense. LSU quarterback Rohan Davey left the game with a hyperextended knee.

"I thought he was a serious candidate for the Heisman Trophy before we played them", said LSU coach Nick Saban, "Now I'm convinced of it." "I think he is a tremendous quarterback" echoed LSU safety Ryan Clark.

Auburn

Coach Tommy Tuberville's unranked Auburn Tigers upset the top-ranked Gators 23–20. The Tigers were 21-point underdogs when they met the Gators at Jordan–Hare Stadium.

Gators quarterback Rex Grossman completed twenty-five of forty-two passes for 364 yards and two touchdowns, but also threw four interceptions.  The Gators dominated statistically, but the Tigers' bend-but-don't-break defense held the Gators rushing game to negative yardage.

Tigers back-up quarterback Daniel Cobb was not so flashy, but played mistake-free football, and the game was tied at 20 late in the fourth quarter.  With 10 seconds left, Tigers placekicker Damon Duval nailed a 44-yard field goal and the Tigers upset the Gators.

Georgia

Florida defeated Georgia 24–10 in the annual rivalry game, overcoming four turnovers and twelve penalties. Grossman passed for 407 yards. Earnest Graham rushed for 131 yards.

The Bulldogs missed a field goal and failed to convert three fourth downs in the second half. The lone score of the second half was a 30-yard touchdown pass to Reche Caldwell. Florida moved into a first-place tie with Tennessee.

Vanderbilt

At homecoming, Florida crushed the Vanderbilt Commodores 71–13. The Gators never punted, and forced five turnovers. They were up 71–0 in the fourth quarter and still tossing passes, amassing 571 total yards in all. Eleven Gators got receptions, and Taylor Jacobs had a breakout game.

Playing just in the first half, Grossman threw for 306 yards and three touchdowns. Backup quarterback Brock Berlin threw three more in the second.

South Carolina

In Columbia, the Gators routed the fourteenth-ranked South Carolina Gamecocks 54–17. The game started shaky for the Gators as Lito Sheppard fumbled the opening kickoff, leading to an easy Gamecock score. A touchdown pass to Jabar Gaffney late in the first quarter started the scoring barrage.

Grossman had his ninth-consecutive 300-yard passing game, and exceeded 5,000 yards passing for his career.

Florida State

Florida easily defeated the rival Florida State Seminoles 37–13. However, the Gators' starting running back Earnest Graham had been controversially injured in Florida's win and was unable the next week to play against Tennessee.

Graham and coach Spurrier accused Darnell Dockett of deliberately twisting Graham's knee, as well as stomping on Grossman's hand. Graham even considered a lawsuit. Dockett denied these charges.

Tennessee

As the season progressed, the postponed game with Tennessee took on greater and greater importance.  Each squad suffered only one close loss and entered the contest with Tennessee ranked No. 6 and Florida ranked No. 2.  The winner was to represent the SEC East and face LSU in the SEC Championship.  With a win in that game, the Gators or Vols were likely to receive an invitation to the Rose Bowl to face the undefeated Miami Hurricanes with a national title on the line. Despite the teams' identical records and much to the chagrin of the Vols, the Gators were 17-and-a-half point favorites at kickoff.

The Volunteers went on to dash the Gators' national title hopes with a 34–32 upset, ending a 30-year winless drought against Florida in Gainesville. The star of the game was Volunteer running back Travis Stephens, who rushed for 226 yards and two touchdowns on 19 carries to lead the Vols' attack.  Without Graham, Florida managed only 36 total yards on the ground. Gator quarterback Rex Grossman threw 51 times for 362 yards and two touchdowns, but his pass on a potentially game-tying two-point conversion attempt with just over a minute left in the 4th quarter fell incomplete.

Orange Bowl (vs. Maryland)

Florida was invited to the Orange Bowl, where they beat Maryland 56–23.

Taylor Jacobs - MVP

Awards and honors
Grossman was the Heisman Trophy runner-up to Nebraska quarterback Eric Crouch, in one of the trophy's closest ballots. Many feel Grossman should have won.

Both Crouch and Grossman made AP All-American.

Spurrier's resignation
In early January, Steve Spurrier said  that he was resigning as Florida's head coach after 12 seasons.

Personnel

Statistics
 QB Rex Grossman: 279/423 (66.0%) for 4,144 yards (9.80 YPA) with 38 TD vs. 12 INT (2.84%)
 QB Brock Berlin: 47/79 (59.5%) for 679 yards (8.59 YPA) with 10 TD vs. 3 INT (3.80%)
 RB Earnest Graham: 141 carries for 799 yards (5.67 YPC) with 11 TD. 12 catches for 129 yards (10.75 YPC) with 0 TD.
 RB Robert Gillespie: 98 carries for 458 yards (4.67 YPC) with 2 TD. 45 catches for 474 yards (10.53 YPC) with 2 TD.
 WR Jabar Gaffney: 74 catches for 1,309 yards (17.69 YPC) with 15 TD.
 WR Reche Caldwell: 69 catches for 1,106 yards (16.03 YPC) with 10 TD.
 WR Taylor Jacobs: 48 catches for 882 yards (18.38 YPC) with 9 TD.
 K Jeff Chandler: 19 FGM and 54 XPM.

Notes

References

Bibliography 

 2009 Southeastern Conference Football Media Guide, Florida Year-by-Year Records, Southeastern Conference, Birmingham, Alabama, p. 60 (2009).
  2012 Florida Football Media Guide, University Athletic Association, Gainesville, Florida, pp. 107–116 (2012).
 Carlson, Norm, University of Florida Football Vault: The History of the Florida Gators, Whitman Publishing, LLC, Atlanta, Georgia (2007).  .
 Golenbock, Peter, Go Gators!  An Oral History of Florida's Pursuit of Gridiron Glory, Legends Publishing, LLC, St. Petersburg, Florida (2002).  .
 Hairston, Jack, Tales from the Gator Swamp: A Collection of the Greatest Gator Stories Ever Told, Sports Publishing, LLC, Champaign, Illinois (2002).  .

Florida
Florida Gators football seasons
Southeastern Conference football champion seasons
Orange Bowl champion seasons
Florida Gators football